Marcel Hartel (born 19 January 1996) is a German professional footballer who plays as a midfielder for  club FC St. Pauli.

Club career

Early career
Born in Köln, Hartel started playing football as a youth for SC West Köln. In 2002, he joined 1. FC Köln's youth system. Having moved through the club's youth ranks, he made his Bundesliga debut on 20 February 2016, in a 1–0 away defeat against Borussia Mönchengladbach. During the 2016–17 season, he made 12 appearances for 1. FC Köln's reserves scoring three goals and contributing five assists.

Union Berlin
In May 2017, Union Berlin announced the signing of Hartel on a three-year deal. He scored his first goal for the club in a 1–1 draw with Arminia Bielefeld. On 31 January 2019, he scored against his former side, Köln, after controlling the ball up into the air and hitting a stunning bicycle kick. The goal was voted Goal of the Month by viewers of Sportschau on ARD, and later also Goal of the Year.

Arminia Bielefeld
On 27 July 2019, after playing a key role in Union Berlin's historic promotion to the Bundesliga, Hartel joined Arminia Bielefeld. In the 2019–20 season, he was part of the title-winning team winning promotion to the Bundesliga. Performing strongly in pre-season, he became one of the undisputed regulars of Arminia at the start of the 2020–21 season and appeared in all the games in the first half of the season. As head coach Uwe Neuhaus was replaced by Frank Kramer in March 2021, Hartel lost his place in midfield. He finished the season with 22 league appearances and one in the cup by the end of the season, as they were eliminated in the first round against Regionalliga side Rot-Weiss Essen.

FC St. Pauli
Hartel joined 2. Bundesliga club FC St. Pauli on 10 August 2021 on an undisclosed deal.

Career statistics

Honours
Arminia Bielefeld
 2. Bundesliga: 2019–20

Individual
 Goal of the Month: January 2019
 Goal of the Year: 2019

References

External links

1996 births
Living people
German footballers
Footballers from Cologne
Association football midfielders
Germany under-21 international footballers
Bundesliga players
2. Bundesliga players
Regionalliga players
1. FC Köln players
1. FC Köln II players
1. FC Union Berlin players
Arminia Bielefeld players
FC St. Pauli players